Phosphorous can refer to:

 Phosphorous acid
 Phosphorous anhydride

See also
 Phosphorus
 
 Phosphorus (disambiguation)